Milton Bradley (1836–1911) was an American business magnate and game pioneer.

Milton Bradley may also refer to:

 Milton Bradley (baseball) (born 1978), American professional baseball player
 Milton Bradley Company, a company founded by the game pioneer
 Milton-Bradley Company (building), a building in Springfield, Massachusetts, U.S.
 Milton Bradley (racehorse trainer) (1935–2023), British racehorse trainer

 
Bradley, Milton